Sree Krishna College is a Guruvayur Devaswom Board arts and science college in Guruvayoor, Thrissur District. The college comes under Calicut University and was established in 18 July 1964. Graduate courses were started in 1967 and Post graduate courses in 1984. At present the college is functioning with 13 UG courses and 5 PG courses.

The college was accredited by NAAC with an A Grade (3.02) in November 2017.

Courses

Three year graduate courses 
 B.Com
 BA English Literature
 BA Functional English(self financing)
 BA Economics 
 BA History
 BA Malayalam 
 BA Sanskrit
 B.Sc Physics
 B.Sc Chemistry
 B.Sc Maths
 B.Sc Botany
 B.Sc Zoology
 B.Sc Biochemistry

Two year post graduate courses 
 MA Malayalam with Journalism
 MA Sanskrit
 M.Sc Physics
 M.Sc Botany
 M.Com (Foreign trade management)

Notable alumni
 C. N. Jayadevan, Ex.MP
 Shivaji Guruvayoor, Actor 
 V. T. Balram, Ex.MLA
 Vijeesh Mani, Producer, director
 Mohammad Anas, Athlete
 Rafeeq Ahamed, Musician
 Joseph Mar Koorilose IX - 14th metropolitan of Malabar Independent Syrian Church

References
https://www.sreekrishnacollege.in/

Colleges affiliated with the University of Calicut
Arts and Science colleges in Kerala
Universities and colleges in Thrissur district
Educational institutions established in 1964
1964 establishments in Kerala
Guruvayur